Korkmaz is a Turkish surname. Notable people with the surname include:

Bülent Korkmaz (born 1968), Turkish footballer and coach
Bülent Korkmaz (archer) (born 1975), Turkish Paralympian archer
Can Korkmaz (born 1992), Turkish basketball player 
Çağla Korkmaz (born 1990), Turkish-German women's footballer
Egemen Korkmaz (born 1982), Turkish footballer
Elvan Korkmaz (born 1985), German politician
Emre Korkmaz (born 1986), Turkish actor.
Ferhat Korkmaz (born 1981), Swedish-born Turkish footballer 
Furkan Korkmaz (born 1997), Turkish basketball player
Inessa Korkmaz (born 1972), Russian-Azerbaijani volleyball player
Mahsum Korkmaz (1956–1986), Commander of the Kurdistan Workers' Party (PKK)'s guerilla forces 
Mert Korkmaz (born 1971), Turkish footballer
Mustafa Korkmaz (born 1988), Dutch wheelchair basketball player of Turkish descent
Ümit Korkmaz (born 1985), Austrian footballer of Turkish descent 
Zeki Korkmaz (born 1988), Turkish footballer 
Zeynep Korkmaz (born 1922), Turkish scholar and dialectologist

Turkish-language surnames